Steinborn is a German surname, from stein (stone) + born (well, creek).

Notable people with this surname include:
 Jeff Steinborn (born 1970), American politician
 Margarete Steinborn (1893–1957), German film editor
 Otton Steinborn (1868–1936), Polish dermatologist and politician

References